Holmenkollen National Arena is a Nordic skiing, ski jumping and biathlon venue located at Holmenkollen in Oslo, Norway. It consists of the large ski jumping hill Holmenkollbakken, the normal hill Midtstubakken and a stadium for cross-country skiing and a shooting range for biathlon. Since 1892, it has hosted the annual Holmenkollen Ski Festival, which is part of the world cup tournaments in ski jumping, cross-country skiing, Nordic combined, as well as annual Biathlon World Cup races. It has previously hosted the 1952 Winter Olympics, and the FIS Nordic World Ski Championships in 1930, 1966, 1982 and 2011.

Facilities

Holmenkollbakken

Holmenkollbakken is a large ski jumping hill with a hill size of 134 and a construction point (K-spot) of 120. It has a spectator capacity for 70,000. It is the first hill in the world with a permanent wind screen; it is able to restrain 45 to 50 percent of the wind.

Midtstubakken

Midtstubakken is a normal hill with a hill size of 106 and a K-point of 95. It has a capacity for 16,000 spectators and was completed in 2010.

Stadium
Next to Holmenkollbakken is a combined cross-country skiing and biathlon stadium. Intersection are grade-separated, which allows for the flow of spectators without interfering with the athletes.

Other facilities
The area includes Holmenkollen Chapel, Holmenkollen Park Hotel Rica and the Holmenkollen Ski Museum. There are five smaller ski jumping hills, ranging from K-5 to K-58.

Transport

Public rail transport is provided to ensure no spectators will use private cars to reach the venue. Instead, all spectators must use the Holmenkollen Line of the Oslo Metro. Holmenkollen Station is located within walking distance of the large hill and cross-country stadium, while Midtstuen Station is closest to Midtstubakken. Holmenkollen Station is the only one on the line with platforms long enough for six cars, which allows a capacity of 9,000 per hour.

References

Venues of the 1952 Winter Olympics
Olympic cross-country skiing venues
Olympic Nordic combined venues
Olympic Parks
Ski stadiums in Norway
Sports venues in Oslo
1892 establishments in Norway
Holmenkollen